Lynn Dalgarno (born 12 November 1935) is an Australian geneticist known for the discovery of the Shine-Dalgarno sequence with his graduate student, John Shine.

Early life and education 
Dalgarno was awarded a B.Sc.(Agr.) in 1958, conducting research with F. J. R. Hird at the Departments of Biochemistry and Agriculture, University of Melbourne, and a Ph.D. in 1962, from the Australian National University (ANU), with a dissertation titled, Respiratory metabolism and processes of uptake in a plant tissue, with research advisor, L. M. Birt at The Russell Grimwade School of Biochemistry, University of Melbourne.

Career 
In his early career (between 1963 and 1967) Dalgarno conducted research, first at the Medical Research Council's National Institute for Medical Research supported by a University of Melbourne Traveling Scholarship to London (with Edward M. Martin, collaborating with E. Horton, S. L. Liu, T. S. Work, and R. A. Cox); second, with François Gros at the Institut de Biologie Physico-Chimique on an MRC-CNRS Exchange Scholarship; and third, a postdoctoral fellowship assisted by a U.S. Public Health Research Grant at California Institute of Technology, with Robert L. Sinsheimer.

In 1968 Dalgarno accepted a post at ANU as a Senior Lecturer, and then as a Reader from 1983 until 1996, when he subsequently became a Research Fellow. His graduate student John Shine said Dalgarno was "a fantastic, enthusiastic lecturer, who was turned on by this molecular biology."

Dalgarno and Shine found the Shine-Dalgarno sequence, described by ANU as "the beginnings of biotechnology":

One of Dalgarno's colleague wrote,

Selected publications

References

Further reading 

 Interview with John Shine
 "DNA — a three-man scoop" (The Double Helix reviewed by Lynn Dalgarno).

1935 births
Australian geneticists
Australian National University alumni
University of Melbourne alumni
Living people
20th-century Australian scientists
Academic staff of the Australian National University